One Love by Tata Young is a Thai studio album released in March 2008. The first single from the album, "One Love", was released on February 14, 2008. The second single, "Cause of Sadness", was later released. One Love is Tata Young's first studio album since her 2006 success Temperature Rising and her first all Thai album in several years.

Track listing
One Love
Boom Bam (บุ่มบ่าม)
Cause of Sadness (ต้นเหตุแห่งความเศร้า)
Good Time
Please (ได้โปรด)
Kidding (อำ)
Living Creature... Without a Heart (สิ่งมีชีวิต...ไม่มีหัวใจ)
I'll Be Your First, Your Last, Your Everything
Unwind Wind (สายลมที่มองไม่เห็น)
Our Home (บ้านเดียวกัน)

Music video
Tata Young music video was premiered on 14 February 2008.

Pictures from the shoot of the music video have leaked onto the internet on February 12, 2008, which depict the pop singer walking around in the fields of hay in Thailand.  Tata is wearing a light pink dress throughout the duration of the video.

References

External links
 Official Website
 Mtv Thailand
 Sony BMG Thailand
 "One Love" album review

2008 albums
Tata Young albums